Óskar Jónasson (born 30 June 1963) is an Icelandic film director and screenwriter. His film Remote Control was screened in the Un Certain Regard section at the 1993 Cannes Film Festival. His most recent film Reykjavík-Rotterdam won four Edda Awards including Director of the Year and Best Screenplay.

Selected filmography
The Sugarcubes: Live Zabor (1989)
SSL-25 (1990, short)
Remote Control (1992)
Limbó (1993, TV series)
Pearls and Swine (1997)
Úr öskunni í eldinn (2000)
Áramótaskaup (2001)
Áramótaskaup (2002)
20/20 (2002)
Svínasúpan (2003, TV series)
Stelpurnar (2005, TV series)
Reykjavík-Rotterdam (2008)
Svartir englar (2008, TV series)
Thor: Legend of the Magical Hammer (2011)
Fiskar á Þurru Landi (2013)
Fyrir framan annað fólk (2016)

References

External links

1963 births
Living people
Oskar Jonasson
Oskar Jonasson
Oskar Jonasson
Oskar Jonasson